Vengeance Valley is a 1951 American Technicolor Western film directed by Richard Thorpe and starring Burt Lancaster, with a supporting cast featuring Robert Walker, Joanne Dru, Sally Forrest, John Ireland and Ray Collins. It is based on the novel by Luke Short. In 1979, the film entered the public domain in the United States because Metro-Goldwyn-Mayer did not renew its copyright registration in the 28th year after publication.

Plot

Fifteen years ago, wealthy but crippled Colorado cattleman Arch Strobie, whose own son Lee was wild, took in young Owen Daybright as a foster son to help raise and control Lee. Now Owen is ranch foreman, but Lee, despite being married to Jen, is  wilder than ever.

Unmarried Lily Fasken gives birth but refuses to identify the father. After Owen gives Lily $500 to help care for the baby, her brothers Hub and Dick believe it must be he, but they are unaware Owen did it on Lee's behalf. The brothers try to beat up Owen, after a fight he lodges a complaint against them. Sentenced to a week in jail, they vow to get even as soon as they get out.

When Arch chides Lee for overdrawing his bank account by withdrawing $500 in gold, Jen realizes that Lee fathered Lily's baby. When she confronts him, Lee tries to lie his way out. She decides to leave him, but Owen and Arch persuade her to stay. Lee inveigles Arch to make him a partner in the ranch by saying that he will strike out on his own unless he gets a half-interest; he gets what he wants and learns that the other half will go to Owen, once Arch retires or dies.

Jen locks Lee out of their bedroom. He gets drunk, mistakenly believing she and Owen are carrying on behind his back. He schemes to get rid of Owen and make a fortune at the same time by conspiring with Hub and Dick to ambush Owen during the spring cattle roundup. On the trail, Lee secretly sells 3,000 head of the cattle, intending to run off with the proceeds. However, Owen learns of the plan.

Lee pretends to have changed his mind. He persuades Owen to ride in with him to cancel the sale, but in fact he lures Owen into a trap. Hub and Dick, waiting in ambush, wound Owen as Lee flees the scene. In the ensuing gunfight, Owen kills Dick. Hearing shots, a group of trailhands ride to Owen's rescue. They chase down and shoot Hub. Owen catches up with Lee and tells him they are both going back to tell everything to Arch. Lee refuses, confident he can outshoot Owen. He draws his gun, forcing Owen to kill him. Owen breaks the news to Arch and Jen.

Cast
 Burt Lancaster as Owen Daybright
 Robert Walker as Lee Strobie
 Joanne Dru as Jen Strobie
 Sally Forrest as Lily Fasken
 John Ireland as Hub Fasken
 Carleton Carpenter as Hewie, a loyal young ranch hand in love with Lily. Hewie is also the storyteller for the audience and Carpenter's voice is heard sporadically in a quiet tone during the movie.
 Ray Collins as Arch Strobie
 Ted de Corsia as Herb Backett, a cattle rustler Owen beats up
 Hugh O'Brian as Dick Fasken
 Will Wright as Mr. Willoughby, the ranch cook
 Grayce Mills as Mrs. Burke
 Tom Fadden as Obie Rune
 Jim Hayward as Sheriff Con Alvis
 James Harrison as Orv Esterly
 Stanley Andrews as Mead Calhoun
 Glenn Strange as Dave Allard (uncredited)

Reception
According to MGM records the film earned $1,997,000 in the US and Canada and $1,149,000 elsewhere, resulting in a profit of $3,138,000.

See also
 List of films in the public domain in the United States

References

External links
 
 
 
 
 
 
 The Round-up. From Vengeance valley. Music: Rudolph George Kopp. - example 1979 copyright renewal for the music: V2581 P215-416
 copyright document V3549D483 - titles 019 to 021 from document V3549 D479-483 P1-66

1951 films
1951 Western (genre) films
American Western (genre) films
Films based on American novels
Films based on Western (genre) novels
Films directed by Richard Thorpe
Films shot in Colorado
Metro-Goldwyn-Mayer films
1951 drama films
1950s English-language films
1950s American films